Scott McGarrahan (born February 12, 1974) is a former American football safety. During his career in the National Football League (NFL) from 1998 to 2005, he played for the Green Bay Packers, Miami Dolphins, Tennessee Titans, San Diego Chargers, and Detroit Lions.

References

1974 births
Living people
Lamar High School (Arlington, Texas) alumni
American football safeties
Green Bay Packers players
Miami Dolphins players
Tennessee Titans players
San Diego Chargers players
Detroit Lions players
New Mexico Lobos football players